William or Willie Andrews may refer to:

Politics and law
William Drennan Andrews (1832–1924), Irish judge
William Henry Andrews (1846–1919), American politician
William E. Andrews (1854–1942), U.S. Congressman from Nebraska
William Shankland Andrews (1858–1936), American lawyer, judge, and politician
William L. Andrews (1865–1936), American politician in the Virginia Senate
William H. Andrews (unionist) (1870–1950), English politician in South Africa
William Noble Andrews (1876–1937), U.S. Congressman from Maryland
William T. Andrews (1898–1984), American politician in the New York State Assembly
William C. Andrews (born 1934), American politician in the Florida House of Representatives
William F. Andrews (politician) (born 1946), American politician in the Florida House of Representatives
William Andrews III (born 1952), American politician in the Mississippi House of Representatives

Religion
William Andrews (priest) (fl. 1702–1736), Irish Anglican priest and educationalist
William Eusebius Andrews (1773–1837), English religious journalist
William Watson Andrews (1810–1897), American clergyman of the Catholic Apostolic Church
William Buckton Andrews (1829–1918), Anglican clergyman in South Australia, a.k.a. "Canon Andrews"

Science and medicine
William Andrews (naturalist) (1802–1880), English naturalist
William Symes Andrews (1847–1929), English electrical engineer
William H. Andrews (biologist) (born 1951), American telomere biologist

Sports
Curley Andrews (William Andrews, fl. 1940s), American baseball player
William Andrews (American football) (born 1955), American football player
Willie Andrews (born 1983), American football player

Others
William Andrews (astrologer) (fl. 1656–1683), astrologer
William Andrews (factory manager) (1835–1914),  English diarist and factory manager for Cash's of Coventry
William Andrews (Australian actor) (1836–1878), Australian stage actor and comedian
William F. Andrews (businessman) (born c. 1933), American businessman
William Andrews (comedian) (born 1977), British actor and comedian
William C. Andrews (art director), British film set designer

See also
Billy Andrews (born 1945), American football player
Billy Andrews (footballer) (born 1886), Irish-American footballer
Bill Andrews (disambiguation)